Berkeley Apartments, also known as the Graystone Hotel (after 1912), is a historic apartment hotel building located at Buffalo in Erie County, New York.

History
Berkeley Apartments was constructed between 1894 and 1897, and is one of the earliest examples of a large multistory building built of reinforced concrete.  it was designed by local architect Carlton T. Strong and engineer Ernest L. Ransome.  The building is in the Italian Renaissance style.

The six-story building hosted visitors to the Pan-American Exposition in the early 1900s. The building became vacant in the early 1990s after decades of decline. In 2002, Ellicott Development Co. purchased the hotel with plans to redevelop the property into a luxury apartment building. Those plans were halted in late 2003 after a large section of roof collapsed during interior demolition work. The building again sat idle until 2013 when work resumed. The building now houses 42 market-rate apartments.

It was listed on the National Register of Historic Places in 1987.

See also
Ellicott Development Co.

References

External links
Berkeley Apartments - U.S. National Register of Historic Places on Waymarking.com
Emporis building page

Residential buildings on the National Register of Historic Places in New York (state)
Residential buildings completed in 1897
Buildings and structures in Buffalo, New York
Renaissance Revival architecture in New York (state)
National Register of Historic Places in Buffalo, New York